Evan John Phillips (born September 11, 1994) is an American professional baseball pitcher for the Los Angeles Dodgers of Major League Baseball (MLB). He previously played in MLB for the Atlanta Braves, Baltimore Orioles and Tampa Bay Rays.

Career

Atlanta Braves
Phillips attended Clayton High School in Clayton, North Carolina and was drafted by the Kansas City Royals in the 33rd round of the 2012 Major League Baseball draft, but did not sign and played college baseball at University of North Carolina at Wilmington. He was then drafted by the Atlanta Braves in the 17th round of the 2015 Major League Baseball draft.

Phillips spent his first professional season with the Danville Braves and Rome Braves, going a combined 2-3 with a 2.73 ERA in 29.2 total relief innings pitched. In 2016, he pitched for the Carolina Mudcats and Mississippi Braves, pitching to a combined 8-4 record and 3.02 ERA in 43 relief appearances between both teams, and after the season played in the Arizona Fall League. Phillips played 2017 with Mississippi and the Gwinnett Braves, going a combined 3-4 with a 6.14 ERA in 51.1 total innings pitched, and started 2018 with Gwinnett Stripers.

Phillips was called up by the Atlanta Braves on June 23, 2018. He returned to the Stripers on June 25, without making a major league appearance. He was recalled on July 2 and made his major league debut the next day. In his debut he pitched  innings, yielding a home run.

Baltimore Orioles
On July 31, 2018, Phillips, Jean Carlos Encarnacion, Brett Cumberland, Bruce Zimmermann and international signing money were traded to the Baltimore Orioles in exchange for Kevin Gausman and Darren O'Day.

In 2020 for the Orioles, Phillips pitched to a 5.02 ERA and 20 strikeouts over 14.1 innings pitched in 14 games. On September 30, 2020, Phillips was outrighted off of the 40-man roster.

In 2021, Phillips made 18 appearances for the Triple-A Norfolk Tides, and had a 5.04 ERA with 35 strikeouts.

On August 2, 2021, Phillips was released by the Orioles.

Tampa Bay Rays
On August 3, 2021, Phillips signed a minor league deal with the Tampa Bay Rays. On August 12, the Rays selected Phillips' contract. He made his Rays debut on August 13, pitching three innings and giving up one run, while earning his first career save. The following day, he was designated for assignment.

Los Angeles Dodgers
On August 16, 2021, the Los Angeles Dodgers claimed Phillips off of waivers.  He made his debut for the Dodgers on August 19, 2021, pitching  innings in relief against the New York Mets and getting his first win as a Dodger. He pitched in a total of seven games for the Dodgers in 2021, allowing four earned runs in  innings. He pitched three scoreless innings over two games in the 2021 NLCS against the Atlanta Braves, allowing only one hit and two walks while striking out six.

In 2022, Phillips pitched in a team-high 64 games and had a 7–3 record and 1.14 ERA.

Personal life
Phillips’ father, Joe played baseball at Anne Arundel Community College.

References

External links

1994 births
Living people
People from Salisbury, Maryland
Baseball players from Maryland
Major League Baseball pitchers
Atlanta Braves players
Baltimore Orioles players
Tampa Bay Rays players
Los Angeles Dodgers players
UNC Wilmington Seahawks baseball players
Rome Braves players
Danville Braves players
Carolina Mudcats players
Mississippi Braves players
Salt River Rafters players
Gwinnett Braves players
Gwinnett Stripers players
Norfolk Tides players
Durham Bulls players